Ronn Carroll is an American actor known primarily for his work on Broadway, with over twenty credits to his name. Career highlights include Oklahoma!, directed by Trevor Nunn, How to Succeed in Business Without Really Trying with Matthew Broderick, and two productions of Annie Get Your Gun with both Ethel Merman and Bernadette Peters. He appeared with Tyne Daly in the 1990 revival of Gypsy. Other Broadway credits include the original casts of On Golden Pond, Crazy for You and Steel Pier. His appearances at Lincoln Center include A Man of No Importance with Roger Reece, Room Service with John Lithgow and Richard Thomas, Woody Allen's The Floating Light Bulb, and Carousel with John Raitt.

Theatre credits

Filmography
 1980 Friday the 13th as Sergeant Tierney
 1981 Friday the 13th Part 2 as Sergeant Tierney (uncredited)
 1983 Spring Break as Arresting Officer
 1986 House as Police Officer
 1987 84 Charing Cross Road as Businessman On Plane
 1987 House II: The Second Story as Deputy
 1989 DeepStar Six as Osborne
 1995 The Real Shlemiel as Uncle Shlemiel (voice)
 1997 Fool's Paradise as Mr. Foxworth
 2005 The Producers as Stormtrooper Mel

References

External links 

Ronn Carroll at BroadwayWorld.com

American male film actors
Year of birth missing (living people)
Living people